The Municipal President of Chihuahua (mayor) is the head of local government of Chihuahua Municipality, in the Mexican state of Chihuahua. 
The mayor's authority includes the state capital, the city of Chihuahua, Chih. 
Since the city serves as the municipal seat and is home to the vast majority of the municipality's population, the position of municipal president is frequently identified with the city, rather than the municipality.

List of municipal presidents of Chihuahua

1974–1976: Oscar Ornelas
   1976–1977: Humberto Martínez Delgado
   1977–1980: Luis Fuentes Molinar
   1980–1983: Ramiro Cota Martínez
   1983–1986: Luis H. Álvarez
   1986: Pedro César Acosta
   1986–1989: Mario de la Torre Hernández
   1989–1992: Rodolfo Torres Medina
   1992–1995: Patricio Martínez García
   1995–1998: Gustavo Ramos Becerra
   1998–2001: José Reyes Baeza Terrazas
   2001–2002: Jorge Barousse Moreno
   2002–2004: Alejandro Cano Ricaud (interim)
   2004–2007: Juan Alberto Blanco Zaldívar
   2007–2010: Carlos Borruel Baquera
   2010: Álvaro Madero Muñoz (interim)
   2010–2013: Marco Quezada Martínez
   2013–2015: Javier Garfio Pacheco
   2015–2016: Eugenio Baeza Fares (interim)
   2016: Javier Garfio Pacheco
   2016–2018: María Eugenia Campos Galván
2018: Marco Antonio Bonilla Mendoza
2018-2021: María Eugenia Campos Galván
2021: María Angélica Granados Trespalacios
2021-Present day: Marco Antonio Bonilla Mendoza

See also
 Timeline of Chihuahua City

References

Chihuahua Enciclopedia de los Municipios de México, INAFED. Accessed 31 October 2008.

People from Chihuahua (state)
Chihuahua
Chihuahua City